Gabrielle Louise Bertin, Baroness Bertin (born 14 March 1978) is a British Conservative member of the House of Lords and political aide best known for her association with David Cameron during his term as Prime Minister of the United Kingdom.

Career 

Bertin was educated at Croydon High School and Southampton University.

She worked for Cameron during his time as shadow education secretary, and for Liam Fox as press secretary. In 2005, Bertin became deputy press officer for Cameron.

In 2003–04, she was paid £25,000 by Pfizer to work as a researcher for The Atlantic Bridge, a now-closed charity run by Fox, while he was shadow health secretary. She was the sole employee of the charity, and worked with Adam Werritty, the executive director, but according to Fox, she did not work in any health role.

By August 2013, it had been announced that she would be switched to director of external relations, with Graeme Wilson of The Sun taking up her old role.

She was nominated for a life peerage as part of David Cameron's Resignation Honours list and was created Baroness Bertin, of Battersea in the London Borough of Wandsworth, on 2 September 2016. She was the youngest member of the House of Lords until the induction of Baroness Blackwood of North Oxford in February 2019.

She is a member of the Joint Committee on the Draft Domestic Abuse Bill.

References 

1978 births
Living people
Conservative Party (UK) life peers
Life peeresses created by Elizabeth II